is a Japanese novelist, lyricist and translator. She was born in 1973 in Yamagata, Yamagata.

Several of her books have gained international recognition, such as The Restaurant of Love Regained (2008; Japanese Title: 食堂かたつむり - Shokudō Katatsumuri), described as a "foodie fable", which was made into a film in 2010 under the title "Shokudo Katatsumuri" ("Rinco's Restaurant").

Publications
 The Restaurant of Love Regained, 2008
 Tsurukame josan'in, 2010
 Atsuatsu o meshiagare, 2011
 Le ruban roman, 2014
 La papeterie Tsubaki : roman, 2016
 Le jardin arc-en-ciel : roman, 2016
 La locanda degli amori diversi, 2016
 Kirakira Kyōwakoku, 2017

References

1973 births
People from Yamagata Prefecture
Writers from Yamagata Prefecture
Japanese novelists
Living people